Wilbert McClure (October 29, 1938 – August 6, 2020) was an American boxer. As an amateur he won gold medals in the light middleweight division at the 1959 Pan American Games and the 1960 Olympics. As a professional he competed from 1961 to 1970.

Personal 
McClure earned degrees in literature and philosophy in 1961 from the University of Toledo and a doctorate in psychology from Wayne State University in Detroit in 1973. He later became a Massachusetts state boxing commissioner.  He was honored in August 2012 for his life's work by the Charles Hamilton Houston Institute for Race and Justice at Harvard Law School.

McClure was found guilty in Wilson v. McClure et al, the first legal case in the US to reach a federal court jury to challenge the concept of same-race discrimination in September 2000. The case was brought by race-black licensed boxing promoter Zeke Wilson against a state sports commission headed by the race-black chairman for damage reparations and punitive redress after his right to conduct professional boxing events was violated.

In this case, race-white boxing commissioner William Pender performed direct discriminatory acts, while the race-black commission chairman Wilbert McClure failed to provide the promoter sufficient protection under his authority and cooperated in the unjust cancellation of a series of boxing events, causing financial harm to the promoter. A unanimous jury verdict found that the race-black Chairman was guilty of racial discrimination along with race-white Commissioner William Pender and both defendants were assessed punitive damages in addition to the compensatory damages awarded by the jury.

The precedent-setting case is the subject of the non-fiction book, The Eighth Round.  The book is being adapted into a motion picture by the same title.

Amateur career 
McClure defeated Carmelo Bossi to win the light middleweight gold medal for the United States at the 1960 Summer Olympics in Rome, Italy.

Amateur highlights 
 1960 U.S. Olympic trials 156-lb champion
 1960 National AAU 156-lb champion
 1959 Named Outstanding Amateur Boxer in the U.S.
 1959 Pan American Games gold medalist
 1959 National AAU champion
 1959 160 lb Intercity Golden Gloves champion
 1958 & 1959 160 lb Chicago Golden Gloves champion
 1958 International Diamond Belt champion, Mexico City

Pro career 
Nicknamed "Skeeter", McClure turned pro in 1961 and had limited success.  He never fought for a major title, and lost to notable pros Luis Manuel Rodríguez, Rubin Carter (and also drew once with Carter), and Johnny Pritchett before retiring in 1970.

References

External links 
 

2020 deaths
1938 births
African-American boxers
Light-middleweight boxers
Boxers at the 1960 Summer Olympics
Olympic boxers of the United States
Medalists at the 1960 Summer Olympics
Olympic gold medalists for the United States in boxing
Boxers at the 1959 Pan American Games
Pan American Games gold medalists for the United States
University of Toledo alumni
Wayne State University alumni
Boxers from Ohio
Sportspeople from Toledo, Ohio
American male boxers
Pan American Games medalists in boxing
Medalists at the 1959 Pan American Games
20th-century African-American sportspeople
21st-century African-American people